This was the first edition of the tournament.

Robin Montgomery won the title, defeating Urszula Radwańska in the final, 7–6(8–6), 7–5.

Seeds

Draw

Finals

Top half

Bottom half

References

External Links
Main Draw

Calgary National Bank Challenger - Singles